John W. de Gruchy (born 18 March 1939) is a Christian theologian known for his work resisting apartheid. He is presently Emeritus Professor at the University of Cape Town and Extraordinary Professor at the University of Stellenbosch.

Biography 
A native of Pretoria, South Africa, de Gruchy studied at the University of Cape Town, Rhodes University, Chicago Theological Seminary and the University of Chicago. He has two doctorates, one in theology and another in the social sciences, and a number of honorary doctorates.

For many years, he was Robert Selby Taylor Professor of Christian Studies at University of Cape Town. He remains an emeritus professor at the University of Cape Town and holds a post as an extraordinary professor at the University of Stellenbosch. A feschrift was published in his honor in 2002.

Some of his earliest works were written in the midst of apartheid in South Africa, speaking out against the legislation and engaging the theology of Dietrich Bonhoeffer to argue for the liberation of the oppressed. After apartheid legislation was abolished in 1991, de Gruchy wrote a number of works speaking about the theological role of art in society and advocating for a theology of reconciliation.

Works

See also
 Reformed theology

References

Chicago Theological Seminary alumni
Living people
South African Christians
1939 births
South African theologians
World Christianity scholars
White South African anti-apartheid activists